Jøvik Chapel is a chapel of the Church of Norway in Tromsø Municipality in Troms og Finnmark county, Norway. It is located in the village of Jøvik, along the Kjosen fjord, an arm off the main Ullsfjorden. It is an annex chapel for the Ullsfjord parish which is part of the Tromsø domprosti (arch-deanery) in the Diocese of Nord-Hålogaland. The white, wooden chapel was originally built as a school. The school closed in 1960. In 1976, the building was converted into a chapel after a renovation into a long church style chapel. The chapel seats about 100 people.

See also
List of churches in Nord-Hålogaland

References

Churches in Tromsø
Churches in Troms
Wooden churches in Norway
20th-century Church of Norway church buildings
Churches completed in 1920
1976 establishments in Norway
Long churches in Norway